Dick Stockton won the title, defeating Geoff Masters 6–2, 6–3, 6–2 in the final.

Draw

Finals

Section 1

Section 2

External links
 1974 South Pacific Championships Draw

Singles